{{DISPLAYTITLE:C28H38O4}}
The molecular formula C28H38O4 (molar mass: 438.599 g/mol, exact mass: 438.2770 u) may refer to:

 Anordrin
 Methenmadinone caproate (MMC)